Altes Amt Lemförde is a Samtgemeinde ("collective municipality") in the district of Diepholz, in Lower Saxony, Germany. Its seat is in the village Lemförde.

The Samtgemeinde Altes Amt Lemförde consists of the following municipalities:
 Brockum
 Hüde
 Lembruch
 Lemförde
 Marl
 Quernheim  
 Stemshorn

References

Samtgemeinden in Lower Saxony